Taboga Forest Reserve, is a protected area in Costa Rica, managed under the Arenal Tempisque Conservation Area, it was created in 1978 by decree 8474-A.

References 

Nature reserves in Costa Rica
Protected areas established in 1978